Antonio Ciano (born 9 April 1981) is an Italian judoka. He competed in the men's 81 kg event at the 2012 Summer Olympics and was eliminated in the second round by Ole Bischof.

References

External links
 
 
 
 

1981 births
Living people
Italian male judoka
Olympic judoka of Italy
Judoka at the 2012 Summer Olympics
Mediterranean Games bronze medalists for Italy
Competitors at the 2009 Mediterranean Games
Mediterranean Games medalists in judo
European Games competitors for Italy
Judoka at the 2015 European Games
20th-century Italian people
21st-century Italian people